The 2010–11 Stony Brook Seawolves men's basketball team represents Stony Brook University in the America East Conference. They are coached by Steve Pikiell, who is currently on his sixth year as a coach for Stony Brook. Stony Brook entered the year as the defending America East regular season champions after a year of school records and successes in the basketball program. Stony Brook currently competes at home in the Pritchard Gymnasium (Stony Brook Arena under renovations). The Seawolves were 2nd place (57pts) in the America East preseason poll behind a close first-place BU (62pts). The Seawolves received their largest broadcasting package in school history for the 2010–11 season including four games with the ESPN family of networks, and a series of games with MSG+.

Preseason

Recruitment

Roster

Coaching

Season 
The 2010–2011 season started with a season opener game against the Connecticut Huskies at the Gampel Pavilion resulting in a 79–52 loss to the eventual national champions. The Seawolves then opened their home season two days later with an 80–43 win against Division III Mount Ida. The Seawolves posted a second straight win at Monmouth on for a 51–49 end of the game for their first ever national broadcast on ESPN (College Tip-off Marathon). The Seawolves went on to win their third straight with a 66–59 over Fairleigh Dickinson. Coming back home the Seawolves played against Wagner, losing a close 58–54 game in which free-throws percentage largely affected the team. After the lost against Wagner, the Seawolves hosted Lehigh at the Gymnasium and at one point in the second half held to a 14-point lead, however, a late run by Lehigh allowed the team to get tie and eventually beat the Seawolves on overtime by a score of 79–76. The Seawolves then traveled to New York, NY to play a match up against the Columbia Lions, a game which the Seawolves lost by a score of 73–72 which resulted in the third straight lost by the Seawolves by four or less points, and the second straight lost in which the Seawolves held substantial leads in the second half but weren't able to close it. The Seawolves then traveled to Holy Cross to play a game which also resulted to be very close but which ended on Seawolves favor with a game winning layup by Dave Coley with a second of regulation to capture the Seawolves fourth win of the season, a score of 54–53. The Seawolves battled Sacred Heart but fell at home to a score of 75–66 and then traveled to South Bend, Indiana to face off against No. 24 Notre Dame, their second Big East team of the season. Seawolves battled Notre Dame for most of the first half keeping a score of 29–26 but allowed an 8–0 run to end the half leading to an eventual 88–62 loss.

The Seawolves opened conference play with a win against UMBC and continued throughout the season with struggles in the offensive end and with injuries affecting their sole senior Chris Martin and other players for most of the season. Due to injuries, Pikiell resorted to using the bench more often allowing for Sophomore like Leonard Hayes to get more playing time. Hayes was able to show his potential, entering the starting five and showing his improvement in the conference tournament. Overall, Stony Brook ended the regular season with a 13–16 record and 8–8 in the America East and headed to the tournament as the number fifth seed. In their quarterfinal match against Albany the Seawolves were able to use strong defense and a stellar offense to drag a 67–61 win against Albany at Hartford against an opponent that swept them in the regular season. The Semifinals then played the next day against No. 1 Vermont ending in a surprising offensive effort by Stony Brook, who led from the beginning to the end, to capture a 69–47 promising win against a Vermont team who also swept them in the regular season. For the first time in Stony Brook's Division I program history, the Seawolves were to participate in the America East championship game. Their next match up was announced to be the No. 2 Boston Terriers. On March 12 the Championship was hosted at Agganis Arena at Boston. Again, Stony Brook showed a strong first half outing and a strong defense for most of game and held to a lead of up to 15 points. However, with less than a minute in the clock the terriers tied the game thanks to the John Holland (America East POY), and then captured the lead with a decisive foul on Stony Brook with 2 seconds of regulation left. Boston went on to win 56–54 to end the Seawolves hopes for their first-ever NCAA tournament bid.

Schedule

|-
!colspan=9 style=| Regular season

|-
!colspan=9 style=| America East tournament

References

Stony Brook Seawolves men's basketball seasons
Stony Brook
Stony Brook
Stony Brook